Crabbs Cross is a district of Redditch in Worcestershire, England.

Crabbs Cross gets its name from the crossroads, known nowadays as the 'Star and Garter Island'. Historically, Crabbs Cross was the junction of Crabbs Cross Lane, with Evesham Road (A441) and the Slough.

Villages in Worcestershire